Motorpoint Arena (originally the  Nottingham Arena) is a multi-use indoor arena joined with the National Ice Centre in the Lace Market district of Nottingham, England. The National Ice Centre and Nottingham Arena were opened by Olympic gold medalist Jayne Torvill on 1 April 2000. The arena is the biggest live entertainment venue in the East Midlands.

History

Background
The arena is part of the National Ice Centre which was constructed on the site of the former Nottingham Ice Stadium. The ice stadium opened in 1939 and was showing its age, so, in September 1995, plans were announced to replace the Ice Stadium. Plans for the new ice rink, supported by the British Olympic Association, were unveiled in October 1996.

Construction
Several buildings were demolished to make way for the new ice centre; this included an Art Deco warehouse and "The Old Cricket Players" pub, which was initially spared but closed a few years later and replaced with appartments. The former Ice Stadium closed in March 2000, and by May 2000 was described as "nearly demolished", with four skip loads of demolition rubble being removed from the site every day.

During excavation for the new building in July 1998 a rare 1,100-year-old Saxon jug was found, which is on display at the Nottingham Castle Museum. A 19th-century graveyard was also found under the car park, from which the bodies were then exhumed.

Opening

On 1 April 2000, the National Ice Centre was officially opened by Olympic gold medalist Jayne Torvill. The second phase of the project — the family rink — was scheduled to be completed by May–June 2001, but opened early on 7 April 2001. The National Ice Centre was the first twin Olympic-sized ice rink in the United Kingdom. The final cost of the project was £43million. The arena was inaugurated by English band, Simply Red on 29 April 2000.

By 2002, the arena was not as popular as planned. The venue posted an operating loss of £1 million in its first year. Concert promoters would often have acts skip Nottingham in favour of Sheffield and Birmingham. HM The Queen visited the National Ice Centre and Arena on 31 July 2002.

In 2007, former radio station Trent FM purchased naming rights for four years, becoming the Trent FM Arena Nottingham. When Trent FM was bought by Global Radio, the naming rights were assigned to Capital FM, and the Arena now became known as Capital FM Arena Nottingham. In 2011, the arena installed a draping system, reducing the capacity to 4,000 for intimate shows. The arena's overall capacity was also expanded from 9,000 to 10,000.

Despite the average event ticket price rising almost £5 from the year before (to £37.22), in the 2012–13 season the arena made a £200,000 "operating deficit", with a 9% drop in attendance at the Arena, and a 6% fall in the number of events held.

Events
Little Mix hold the record for the largest concert at the arena, with an audience of 15,685. Westlife has performed the most at the arena, with 22 shows between 2001 and 2019. As of 2014 the arena has hosted artists and events including Bruno Mars, Ed Sheeran, Katy Perry, Elton John, Lady Gaga, One Direction, The X Factor Tour, "Strictly Come Dancing on Tour" and We Will Rock You, as well as conferences, galas and balls, including Nottingham Trent University’s Graduation Ball. On 17 November 2012, the arena hosted the fight between Nottingham boxer Carl Froch and Yusaf Mack, with Froch retaining his IBF super-middleweight world title.

References

External links

Official website

Boxing venues in the United Kingdom
Indoor arenas in England
Buildings and structures in Nottingham
Music venues in Nottinghamshire
Tourist attractions in Nottingham
Music venues completed in 2000
Exhibition and conference centres in England
Sports venues in Nottingham
Darts venues
Netball venues in England
2000 establishments in England